Peter Imhona Onekpe (born 15 February 1949) was the Anglican Bishop of Ika in Bendel Province  of the Church of Nigeria.

Onekpe was the pioneer bishop when the Diocese of Ika was created in 2001. He retired in 2018, and Godfrey Ifeanyi Ekpenisi was elected as the second Bishop of Ika in September 2018.

Onekpe was born on 15 February 1949 in Etsako West, Edo State. He attended St. Peter's Anglican Secondary Modern School, Jattu-Uzairue, from 1961 to 1963, followed by the Catechist Training School at Akure, graduating in 1967. He graduated from Immanuel College of Theology, Ibadan in 1974, and was ordained in 1975.

Onekpe was the 4th Bishop of Benin, consecrated in 1995, and translated to Esan Diocese in September 2000.

References 

1949 births
Anglican bishops of Ika
21st-century Anglican bishops in Nigeria
Nigerian Anglicans
Alumni of Immanuel College of Theology, Ibadan
People from Edo State
Living people
Anglican bishops of Benin
Anglican bishops of Esan